Geoff Cooke may refer to:
Geoff Cooke (cyclist) (born 1944), British former national cycling coach
Geoff Cooke (rugby union) (born 1941), England rugby coach

See also
Geoffrey Cook (disambiguation)
Jeffrey Cook (disambiguation)